Eddelu Manjunatha (Wake Up Manjunatha) is a 2009 Indian Kannada language cult black comedy film written and directed by Guruprasad, and produced by journalist and director V. Sanath Kumar. Its stars Jaggesh and Yagna Shetty in the lead roles. Tabla Nani and V. Manohar appear in supporting in roles.

At the 2009–10 Karnataka State Film Awards, Guruprasad won the award for Best Screenplay. At the 57th Filmfare Awards South, the film won two awards – Best Director (Guruprasad) and Special Jury Award (Yagna Shetty).

Plot
This film is about the life and times of a lazy and jobless middle-aged man named Manjunatha ("Manja") who considers his life as an eventual existence rather than a practical, deserving and a capable one. His laziness is portrayed in the film as not a quality but as an ethic imbibed within his general thoughts and notions of the everyday world that surrounds him. Through his formative years, his thinking becomes pragmatic in considering that livelihood can always be sought through alternate sources rather than being a puppet to how the world goes about through linear methods of gaining success and money. The other essentially important character in the film is a visually impaired person named Naani (played by Tabla Naani). Although being born blind, he wishes to be a film director. Naani's most positive aspect of the role is that he does not believe that his physical disability could stop him from achieving what he dreams, that is to be a filmmaker. The film is structured around the lengthy conversation, which happens in a captive lodge room, between Manja and Naani where each depicts their ideologies and experiences and co-relate their thoughts. Being a Jaggesh film, the film is nowhere short in containing blatant satirical humour and constant metaphors. The characters of Manja and Naani form contrasting personalities - Manja being an unmotivated, lazy and irresponsible guy and Naani being optimistic and ambitious. Naani happens to meet Manja is a very interesting scenario. Even with their contrasting personalities, Manja and Naani get along together pretty well.

The other important, yet minimally portrayed, the role is of Manja's wife Gowri (played by Yagna Shetty). Manja admittedly marries Gowri in the fact that he was getting a small house as a dowry. Gowri struggles to save her relationship while Manja is doused into the casual habits of alcohol, his influential "circle" of friends, betting, occasional petty thieving at random jobs, inability to sustain decent jobs, wife-bitching and other habits including schemes that eventually thicken the gap between living a moral and meaningful life and being an incapable disloyal husband. However, Gowri's character is portrayed to be of a devout woman who honours the capacity of developing a more healthy family hood through her husband changing his ways someday or the other. But days and years go on and Manja's lifestyle remains unchanged much to the chagrin of Gowri.

The conversation now continues shifting from the lodge to Manja's home itself. After celebrating their freedom from the lodge with alcoholism that night they find themselves again captive within the house due to the help of the local inspector who assists Gowri to tackle Manja's unyielding ways. Naani then talks about the plot of his film, which was seemingly ignored by the producer with whom he had placed his trust upon (and for the reason with which he ended up being captive in the lodge). Manja, hearing of the simple story of Dr Rajkumar's pledged eyes and how they were now seeing a world through another person, is taken aback and applauds Naani for such a heartwarming plot and how the -Annavru-'s fans would welcome such a movie. He motivates Naani with all success if Naani ever made the film by taking out his mother's prized 50 rupee note from the cupboard and giving it to Naani. He tells Naani that it was considered as a lucky charm to any person that received it. He also happens to find a note in the cupboard that Gowri leaves behind (after her inability to tell him personally that night due to his inebriated state) to Manja conveying that she was now carrying and that he would soon become a father. Manja's personality suddenly defines a change after reading the news. He is unable to express his joy, apart from sharing it with Naani, at that moment being locked in his home. He tries calling Gowri but he doesn't get her on-line. In the midst of all this, there concocts a life turning situation for Manja at that moment. His wife returns home struck in pain. Gowri had killed the developing child in her womb due to the burdensome worry which she concluded that she wasn't in a state to be able to maintain and grow a child while having such a lackluster and incapable husband. She perceived that it was best for the child to not come to life and face a deteriorated lifestyle. Naani leaves the house expressing his ill-timed presence in the development of such an event. Manja is clipped between a moment of where he faced fresh joy like he had not known for a long long time where he believed that the child, who would be his Lakshmi (the Goddess of wealth), would change his life for the better and to another moment that his 'Lakshmi' would not be happening. In his state of hopelessness, he threatens Gowri as to what rights she held to kill his child. Gowri is throbbing in pain to be able to reply to his questions. In this delusion of Manja, Lakshmi -the unborn child, appears to him and speaks to him as to how ill-fated she would have been to have been born as a daughter to such a father. Lakshmi says that Gowri, her mother, did not kill her and that Manja, her father, killed her and suggests to him that he could celebrate this occasion with his friends by drinking along with them. Manja's remorse knows no bounds. He reflects back Lakshmi's words to Gowri and says to his wife that neither his own parents nor his own wife or any of his gurus could ever be a guru to him, but the unborn dead child which will never happen in his existence was his ultimate guru to his final immediate realization of the value of life.

Cast
 Jaggesh as Manjunatha (Manja)
 Yagna Shetty as Gowri
 Tabla Nani as Nani
 V. Manohar
 Guruprasad as Police Inspector
 A. S. Murthy
 Sadananda
 Veena Bhat
 Sulochana
 Sunitha
 Manjula
 Master Punarva
 Master Ravikiran Shastry
 Master Lokesh

Production
The dialogues, penned by Guruprasad, being very witty and sharp often reflect the society's dark sides. The non-linear screenplay offers a refreshing film-watching experience. The lead character Manjunatha is played by Jaggesh.
Ashok V Raman’s lens brings alive Guru's script, his camera work gathers attention for his close-ups. He has captured the entire film in small rooms and lanes.

Soundtrack
Background score and soundtrack are composed by Anoop Seelin. All the songs from soundtrack enjoyed frequent airplay in FM radio and T.V. music channels. Only two songs are used in the film.

Reception

Critical response 

R G Vijayasarathy of Rediff.com scored the film at 3.5 out of 5 stars and says "Music director V Manohar returns to acting in a special role. Tabala Naani, who had a wonderful role in Guru's first film Mata, proves that he is a very good actor whose talent is still untapped. The songs written by Guru himself are apt and meaningful. Go and enjoy the laugh riot". A critic from The New Indian Express wrote "V. Manohar has done a good job. Tabala Naani's histrionics are worth a special mention. Anoop Sileen's musical score goes with the tempo of the film. Overall, "Eddelu Manjunatha" is a neat satirical entertainer". B S Srivani from Deccan Herald wrote "Eddelu Manjunatha delivers a hard punch, but will the punch mould characters into shape is another story altogether".

Awards
2009–10 Karnataka State Film Awards
 Best Screenplay – Guruprasad

57th Filmfare Awards South
 Best Director – Guruprasad
 Special Jury Award – Yagna Shetty

References

External links
 
 Eddelu Manjunatha at Oneindia.in
 Review at Deccan Herald
 Review at Thatskannada
 Review at Sirigandha

2009 films
2000s Kannada-language films
Indian black comedy films
Indian nonlinear narrative films
Films directed by Guruprasad
Films scored by Anoop Seelin